Jean Chopin (born 9 October 1994) is a French footballer who currently plays for Iris Club de Croix in the Championnat National 3.

External links

1994 births
Living people
French footballers
French expatriate footballers
RC Lens players
K.V. Oostende players
R.F.C. Tournai players
Iris Club de Croix players
Belgian Pro League players
Championnat National 2 players
Championnat National 3 players
Luxembourg National Division players
Association football goalkeepers
French expatriate sportspeople in Belgium
French expatriate sportspeople in Luxembourg
Expatriate footballers in Belgium
Expatriate footballers in Luxembourg